Mikhaela Olegovna Kalancha (Russian: Михаэла Олеговна Каланча, born 5 July 1994) is a Moldovan-born Russian competitor in synchronised swimming.

Career
Kalancha won a gold medal at the 2015 World Aquatics Championships and a gold medal at the 2013 World Aquatics Championships in Team free routine combination.

In 2016, Kalancha began competing in mixed synchronized swimming and partnered with Aleksandr Maltsev at the 2016 European Championships; there they won gold in mixed free and technical routines respectively.

The next year, they took part in the 2017 World Aquatics Championships in Budapest, and won gold and silver respectively in the mixed free and technical routines.

References

External links
 

1994 births
Living people
Russian synchronized swimmers
World Aquatics Championships medalists in synchronised swimming
Synchronized swimmers at the 2013 World Aquatics Championships
Synchronized swimmers at the 2015 World Aquatics Championships
Synchronized swimmers at the 2017 World Aquatics Championships
European Aquatics Championships medalists in synchronised swimming
Universiade medalists in synchronized swimming
Universiade gold medalists for Russia
Sportspeople from Chișinău
Moldovan emigrants to Russia
Russian people of Moldovan descent
Medalists at the 2013 Summer Universiade